Nation FM, formerly known as Easy FM, is an English-speaking national radio station based in Nairobi, Kenya. It is owned by the Nation Media Group. Nation FM was broadcasting as of December 2019.

References

External links

Radio stations in Kenya
Nation Media Group
Mass media in Nairobi